Events from the year 1990 in Argentina

Incumbents
 President: Carlos Menem
 Vice president: Eduardo Duhalde

Governors
Governor of Buenos Aires Province: Antonio Cafiero
Governor of Catamarca Province: Ramón Saadi
Governor of Chaco Province: Danilo Baroni
Governor of Chubut Province: Néstor Perl then Fernando Cosentino
Governor of Córdoba: Ricardo Guillermo Leconte
Governor of Corrientes Province: Ricardo Guillermo Leconte
Governor of Entre Ríos Province: Jorge Busti
Governor of Formosa Province: Vicente Joga
Governor of Jujuy Province: Ricardo de Aparici (until 7 November); Eduardo Alderete (from 7 November)
Governor of La Pampa Province: Néstor Ahuad
Governor of La Rioja Province: Agustín de la Vega
Governor of Mendoza Province: José Octavio Bordón
Governor of Misiones Province: Julio César Humada
Governor of Neuquén Province: Pedro Salvatori
Governor of Río Negro Province: Horacio Massaccesi
Governor of Salta Province: Hernán Cornejo
Governor of San Juan Province: Carlos Enrique Gómez Centurión
Governor of San Luis Province: Adolfo Rodríguez Saá
Governor of Santa Cruz Province: Ricardo del Val (until 6 July); José Ramón Granero (from 6 July)
Governor of Santa Fe Province: Víctor Reviglio
Governor of Santiago del Estero: César Iturre
Governor of Tucumán: José Domato

Vice Governors
Vice Governor of Buenos Aires Province: Luis María Macaya
Vice Governor of Catamarca Province: Oscar Garbe
Vice Governor of Chaco Province: Emilio Carrara
Vice Governor of Corrientes Province: Gabriel Feris
Vice Governor of Entre Rios Province: Domingo Daniel Rossi
Vice Governor of Formosa Province: Gildo Insfrán
Vice Governor of Jujuy Province: Eduardo Alderete (until 7 November), vacant thereafter (from 7 November)
Vice Governor of La Pampa Province: Edén Cavallero
Vice Governor of La Rioja Province: vacant
Vice Governor of Misiones Province: Julio Piró
Vice Governor of Nenquen Province: José Lucas Echegaray
Vice Governor of Rio Negro Province: Pablo Verani
Vice Governor of Salta Province: Pedro de los Ríos
Vice Governor of San Juan Province: Wbaldino Acosta
Vice Governor of San Luis Province: Ángel Rafael Ruiz
Vice Governor of Santa Cruz: José Ramón Granero (until 6 July); José Ramón Granero (from 6 July)
Vice Governor of Santa Fe Province: Antonio Vanrell
Vice Governor of Santiago del Estero: Manuel Hipólito Herrera

Events
February 15 - Diplomatic relations between Argentina and the UK are restored, eight years after Argentina's invasion of the Falkland Islands, a British Dependent Territory.
8 July – 1990 FIFA World Cup Final (Association football): Argentina lose 1–0 to West Germany in the final of the 1990 FIFA World Cup in Rome, Italy.

Births
10 January - Facundo Gambandé,  actor and singer
19 January - Tatiana Búa, tennis player

Deaths
22 July – Manuel Puig, Argentinian writer (born 1932)

See also

List of Argentine films of 1990

References

 
Years of the 20th century in Argentina
Argentina
1990s in Argentina
Argentina